The Schweizer Laufhund is a breed of scenthound, originally from Switzerland.

History

In the 15th century, this breed was sought after by Italian dog lovers and in the 18th century by the French for its exceptional aptitude for hunting hare. Its native lines have been influenced by scenthounds of French breeding brought back to Switzerland by mercenaries. In 1882, a standard was established for each of the five varieties of the Swiss Hound. In 1909, those standards were revised and the total disappearance of the hound of Thurgovie was noted. On 22 January 1933, one single standard was established for the five varieties of the Swiss Hound. The most ancient variety, the St. Hubert Jura Hound, has disappeared.

See also
 Dogs portal
 List of dog breeds

References

External links

FCI breeds
Scent hounds
Rare dog breeds
Dog breeds originating in Switzerland